Venice Center is a hamlet in Cayuga County, New York, United States. Venice Center had its own post office until June 14, 1988.

References

Hamlets in Cayuga County, New York
Hamlets in New York (state)